Bor is a town in Tachov District in the Plzeň Region of the Czech Republic. It has about 4,400 inhabitants. The historic town centre is well preserved and is protected by law as an urban monument zone.

Administrative parts
Villages of Bezděkov, Boječnice, Borovany, Čečkovice, Damnov, Doly, Hlupenov, Holostřevy, Kosov, Kurojedy, Lhota, Lužná, Málkovice, Malovice, Muckov, Nová Hospoda, Nový Dvůr, Ostrov, Skviřín, Velká Ves and Vysočany are administrative parts of Bor.

Geography
It lies in the Upper Palatine Forest Foothills. The territory is rich in ponds.

History

The first written mention of Bor is from 1263, when its location by a water castle is documented. After it was destroyed in 1318, the walls were built. In 1369, Bor gained town privileges.

Only three noble families took turns in ownership of Bor. Until 1650, the town was held by the Lords of Bor. From 1650 to 1720, it was owned by the Lords of Götzen. Since 1720, it was continuously owned by the Löwenstein family. During their rule, Bor was the centre of a large estate.

Demographics

Economy
Bor is home to two large producers of automotive parts that are among the most important employers in the region. IDEAL Automotive s.r.o., a Czech branch of German company IDEAL Automotive GmbH founded in 1999, is a manufacturer of textile parts for cars with more than 1,000 employers. Adient company specializes in the assembly of car seats and its factory in Bor has about 800 employees.

Transport
The D5 motorway passes through the territory, north of the town proper.

Sights

The town is known for the neo-Gothic Bor Castle. The castle was created by rebuilding the old water castle in the 19th century. The cylindrical tower remains of the original castle, and today is the dominant feature of the town.

The Baroque Church of Saint Nicolas is a landmark of the town square. It was first mentioned in 1282, rebuilt in the 14th–16th centuries, and after a big fire in 1647 once again rebuilt. It has a late Gothic prismatic tower.

Twin towns – sister cities

Bor is twinned with:
 Pleystein, Germany
 Wernberg-Köblitz, Germany

Notable people
Charles, 6th Prince of Löwenstein-Wertheim-Rosenberg (1834–1921), German nobleman and politician

References

External links

Cities and towns in the Czech Republic
Populated places in Tachov District